Carnedd y Ddelw is a summit in the Carneddau mountains in Wales, north-east of Foel-fras. It is the Nuttall top of Drum (Wales).
Its eastern slopes are drained by the Afon Tafolog, a tributary of Afon Roe that flows through the village of Rowen before joining the River Conwy. It is also the final top on Carnedd Llewelyn's long northern spur. To the north-west is Tal y Fan, the most northerly 2000 foot tall mountain in the Carneddau and Wales. The summit has two large shelter cairns, hollowed out from a large Bronze Age burial cairn.

References

Mountains and hills of Snowdonia
Nuttalls
Mountains and hills of Conwy County Borough
Mountains and hills of Gwynedd
Abergwyngregyn
Caerhun